Common names: black-tailed horned pitviper.

Mixcoatlus melanurus is a venomous pitviper species endemic to the mountains of southern Mexico. No subspecies are currently recognized.

Description
In Mexico, it is called a necazcoatl, from the Nahualt words necaztli and coatl which means "eared-serpent" referring to its "horns".

Geographic range
The type locality given is "Mexico".

Conservation status
This species is classified as Endangered (EN) on the IUCN Red List of Threatened Species with the following criteria: B1ab(iii) (v3.1, 2001). It is therefore considered to be facing a very high risk of extinction in the wild. In 2007 when it was last assessed, the population trend was down.

Behavior
Terrestrial.

References

Further reading
 Müller, L. 1924. Ueber neue oder seltene mittel- und südamerikanische Amphibien und Reptilien. Mitteilungen aus dem Zoologischen Museum in Berlin 11 (1): 75-93. (Trimeresurus melanurus, p. 92.)

External links
 

Crotalinae
Snakes of North America
Endemic reptiles of Mexico
Reptiles described in 1924